Herad is a former municipality that was located in the old Vest-Agder county in Norway. The  municipality existed from 1838 until its dissolution in 1965. The municipality encompassed the area northeast of the lake Framvaren inside the present-day municipality of Farsund in what is now Agder county. The administrative centre of the municipality was the village of Sande where the Herad Church is located.

Name
The municipality (originally the parish) was named Herred which means "village" or "hamlet".  The spelling of the name was changed to Herad during the late 19th century as part of Norwegian spelling reforms.

History
The parish of Herred was established as a municipality on 1 January 1838 (see formannskapsdistrikt law). On 17 October 1893, the southern district of Herad was separated to create the new municipality of Spind. The split left Herad with 1,019 inhabitants. During the 1960s, there were many municipal mergers across Norway due to the work of the Schei Committee. On 1 January 1965, Herad (population: 359) was merged with the municipalities of Spind (population: 606), Lista (population: 4,544), and the town of Farsund (population: 2,208) to form the new, larger municipality of Farsund.

Government
All municipalities in Norway, including Herad, are responsible for primary education (through 10th grade), outpatient health services, senior citizen services, unemployment and other social services, zoning, economic development, and municipal roads.  The municipality was governed by a municipal council of elected representatives, which in turn elected a mayor.

Municipal council
The municipal council  of Herad was made up of representatives that were elected to four year terms.  The party breakdown of the final municipal council was as follows:

See also
List of former municipalities of Norway

References

External links
Weather information for Herad 

Farsund
Former municipalities of Norway
1838 establishments in Norway
1965 disestablishments in Norway